
The following lists events that happened during 1840 in South Africa.

Events
 The Cape Town Municipality is formed and has a population of 20,016, of which 10,560 are Whites
 26 March - The town of Wellington is founded in the Cape Colony
 16 October - Potchefstroom, Winburg and Natalia unifies as a single Boer republic

References
See Years in South Africa for list of References

 
South Africa
Years in South Africa